is a Japanese retired football player.

Club statistics
Updated to 1 March 2021.

References

External links

Profile at Tokyo Verdy
Profile at Mito HollyHock

1986 births
Living people
Meiji University alumni
Association football people from Tokyo
Japanese footballers
J1 League players
J2 League players
Tokyo Verdy players
Kashiwa Reysol players
Montedio Yamagata players
Mito HollyHock players
FC Machida Zelvia players
Thespakusatsu Gunma players
Association football forwards